Kirazlıköprü Dam is a dam in Bartın Province, Turkey, which began construction in 1999 and is expected to be completed by 2018. The development was backed by the Turkish State Hydraulic Works.

See also

List of dams and reservoirs in Turkey

External links
DSI directory, State Hydraulic Works (Turkey), Retrieved December 16, 2009

Dams in Bartın Province
Hydroelectric power stations in Turkey